is a 65-minute television special first originally aired in April 1986, in the Kansai region network Yomiuri Telecasting Corporation. Although credited to Leiji Matsumoto, the show was originally created to celebrate the 35th anniversary of the Kansai Electric Power Company, who sponsored and produced the film. It was later released on VHS format on November 21, 1987, by Pony Canyon.

The events of the story are centered on a Japanese solar power plant based in the planet Mercury called "Saint Elmo". Its name was based on the rare scientific phenomenon called St. Elmo's fire, named after Erasmus of Formiae. This phenomenon occurs in electrical weather at which high points (like masts on ships) will charge and give off a glow.

Plot

Japan builds a large space power plant called Saint Elmo in the planet Mercury. The plant supports Earth with its large solar energy supply, but, when there is an abnormality at the plant, Earth has to send several technicians to fix the problem.

Staff
Director: Tomoharu Katsumata
Script: Hiroyasu Yamaura
Music: Michiru Oshima
Animation: Yasuhiro Yamaguchi
Design: Katsumi Itahashi

Cast
Tōru Furuya, as 
Hideyuki Tanaka
Kei Tomiyama
Keiko Han
Kōzō Shioya
Leiji Matsumoto
Masako Nozawa
Reiko Mutō

Theme songs
The show features two theme songs, "Prometheus Futatabi" and "Tomoshibi wa Eternity", both performed by Yūko Ishikawa. The first was composed by Akihiro Yoshimi, while the second was composed by Yūhei Hanaoka. They were both arranged by Eiji Kawamura and the lyrics were written by Kayoko Fuyumori.

References

External links
Leijiverse: Saint-Elmo Hikari no Raihôsha
 

1980s science fiction films
1986 anime films
1986 television films
1986 films
Anime television films
Japanese animated science fiction films
Fiction set on Mercury (planet)
Toei Animation films
Films directed by Tomoharu Katsumata